Juan José Rodríguez Pérez is a Puerto Rican politician and  former mayor of Ciales. Marcano is affiliated with the Popular Democratic Party (PPD) and he served as mayor from 2013 to 2017.

References

Living people
Mayors of places in Puerto Rico
Popular Democratic Party (Puerto Rico) politicians
People from Ciales, Puerto Rico
Year of birth missing (living people)